A.J. Applegate is an American pornographic actress.

Early life 
AJ Applegate was born in Massapequa, New York.

Career 
AJ Applegate began working as a stripper when she was 19 years old. She later worked as a nude model, fetish model, and dance teacher.

Applegate entered the adult film industry in 2012 at the age of 22 and initially used the stage name Kaylee Evans.

Applegate told AVN she planned to work in the adult industry for as long as possible and achieve "maybe even MILF status". She also stated that she hopes to direct and have her own production company in the future.

Personal life 
Applegate attended courses to earn a personal training certification.

Applegate has the Italian phrase "Ballo di Amore" (translation: "Dance of Love") tattooed on her right hip, three piercings on each ear, and a navel piercing.

Applegate's long-time partner Bill Bailey died in March 2019.

On December 8, 2019, Applegate gave birth to a son.

Awards and nominations

References

External links 

 
 
 

American cheerleaders
American female adult models
American female erotic dancers
American erotic dancers
American pornographic film actresses
Dance teachers
Living people
People from Massapequa, New York
Pornographic film actors from New York (state)
21st-century American actresses
Year of birth missing (living people)